Cynthiana is a census-designated place in northwestern Perry Township, Pike County, Ohio, United States. Cynthiana no longer has a post office and the mailing address has been changed to Bainbridge, OH 45612. It lies along State Route 41.

Gallery

References

Census-designated places in Ohio
Census-designated places in Pike County, Ohio